Teja Bhai and Family is a 2011 Indian Malayalam-language action comedy film directed by Deepu Karunakaran, starring Prithviraj Sukumaran, Akhila Sasidharan, and Suraj Venjaramoodu in the lead roles. One of the songs, Oru Madhura Kinavin (remix version), was sung by Vijay Yesudas. The original version of this song from the movie, Kanamarayathu, was sung by Vijay's father, K. J. Yesudas.

Plot 

Teja Bhai, a well known don in Malaysia, and his sidekicks are the top news of major dailies. One day, he happens to fall in love with Vedhika, a girl who happens to pass through his life. Vedhika also lives in Kuala Lumpur and volunteers in an orphanage and is involved in several philanthropic activities. Teja under the name Roshan befriends her. The film revolves around on the love between them, without Vedika knowing the real job of Teja.

Vedhika's father Damodarji wants his daughter to be married to a man with high social status and family heritage. The power of love makes Teja change from his way of life as an underworld don and he decides to make a good family and for this, he flies to Kerala. Teja under the name Roshan, tries to find his estranged family. He also enlists the help of a pseudo swami Vashya Vachassu. The thread takes hilarious turns with the arrival of Vedhika and her father to join in Teja's family. Unable to find his real family, Teja hires drama artists and small-time con artists to pose as his relatives. Meanwhile, some of Teja's enemies are also after him and his gang. There is also a struggle of hiding his real identity from Vedhika and her father. The hilarious consequences of these actions and the story that ensues and how Teja manages to win the hand of his love amidst all this chaos form the crux of the movie.

Cast 

 Prithviraj Sukumaran as Teja Bhai / Roshan Varma
 Suraj Venjaramoodu as Rajaguru Maha Rishi Vashya Vachassu
 Akhila Sasidharan as Vedhika
 Thalaivasal Vijay as Damodarji
 Jagathy Sreekumar as Vasudevan Nair
 Jagadish as Govindan Nair
 Salim Kumar as Divakaran Nair
 Prem Kumar as Hari Prasad
 Mohan Jose as Advocate
 Indrans as Raghavan Nair
 Kochu Preman as Ravindran Nair
 Sidhartha Siva as Blade
 Ajith Kollam as Srank
 Ashokan as Gopakumar
 Nandhu as Mahadevan Thampi
 Bindu Panicker as Lathika
 Manju Pillai as Rathi Devi
 Kulappulli Leela as Ramani
 Ponnamma Babu as Manikutty
 Krishna Prabha as Rema
 Suman as Mohan Kartha
 Rajeev Govinda Pillai as Sanjay Kartha
 Nedumudi Venu
 Kollam Thulasi
 Kottayam Nazeer as Santhosh, Police Inspector
 Bheeman Raghu as Johnny
 Vettukili Prakash
 Mafia Sasi as Ammittu
 Shakeela as Surveyor from Health Department
 Chali Pala as Jabbar
 Shobha Mohan in cameo
 Manka Mahesh

Production 

The film was shot in Thiruvananthapuram and Malaysia.

Soundtrack 
The soundtrack features 3 songs composed by Deepak Dev, 1 tracks composed by Abu Murali and a Retro Mix version of "Oru Madhurakinaavin Lehariyil" from the 80s film Kaanamarayathu.

Reception 

Teja Bhai opened to mixed reviews. Metro matinee, reports the movie to have collected 2.6 crores within 10 days while cinebuzz.co.in says the movie to have grossed 5 crores in 30 days.

Box office 
The film collected 5,664 from UK box office.

References

External links 

 
  Teja Bhai & Family : Review  – KeralaBoxOffice.com
 Teja Bhai & Family – Zonkerala.com
https://web.archive.org/web/20110925201505/http://www.cinebuzz.co.in/news/Cinebuzz-Onam-card.htm

2010s crime comedy films
2010s Malayalam-language films
2011 films
2011 romantic comedy films
Films shot in Thiruvananthapuram
Films shot in Malaysia
Indian crime comedy films
Indian gangster films
Indian romantic comedy films
Mafia films
Romantic crime films